Juan de Ferreras y García (1 June 1652, La Bañeza - 8 June 1735), Spanish priest who became one of the founding members of the Royal Spanish Academy in 1713.

Once opened to the intellectuals the Royal Library by a decree of 1711, and its real opening in 1712 the Royal Librarian Gabriel Alvarez de Toledo died soon and there were pressures from the Jesuits to get Juan de Ferreras appointed as Royal Librarian. He coordinated the formal royal decrees on the Rules of Use of the Library in 1716, stating that the Director should be the Confessor of the King.

In 1717, as retribution for the Catalan support to the Habsburgs during the Spanish Succession War, Philip V of Spain closed all existing Catalan universities and unified them under the newly created University of Cervera. The new institution actively recruited many former professors of the Colegio de Cordelles and, as a result, ended up under the influence of Jesuits.

Further, the Seminario de Nobles of Madrid, created in 1727 would be also strongly influenced by the Jesuits. As the Royal Library got as a rule to receive  no less than one book printed in Spain since then, the amount of all kinds of information available to such people began to increase exponentially. 

1652 births
1735 deaths
People from La Bañeza
Spanish Roman Catholic priests